is a Japanese actor. He has appeared in films such as Chaos and Tokyo Playboy Club.

Filmography

Film
1980s
Tora's Tropical Fever (1980)
Foster Daddy, Tora! (1980)
Sailor Suit and Machine Gun (1981)
Tora-san, the Expert (1982)
Okinawan Boys (1983)
Tora-san's Island Encounter (1985)
Final Take (1986)
1990s
No Worries on the Recruit Front (1991)
Fireworks, Should We See It from the Side or the Bottom? (1993)
Love Letter (1995)
Helpless (1996)
Swallowtail (1996)
The Pillow Book (1996), The Husband
Two Punks (1996)
The Eel (1997)
April Story (1998)
Tokyo Eyes (1998)
The Thin Red Line (1998)
Audition (1999)
Shady Glove (1999)
2000s
Gojoe: Spirit War Chronicle (2000)
Whiteout (2000)
Chaos (2000), Komiyama
Eureka (2000)
Hush! (2001), Shoji Kurita
2009 Lost Memories (2002), Hideyo
Border Line (2002)
KT (2002)
Harmful Insect (2002)
Dead End Run (2003)
Tokyo Noir (2004)
Lady Joker (2004)
Out of This World (2004)
Scrap Heaven (2005)
Noriko's Dinner Table (2005), Tetsuzo Shimabara
Aegis (2005)
Crickets (2006)
Sugar and Spice (2006)
The Pavillion Salamandre (2006), Morihiro Kagawa
Invisible Waves (2006), Lizard
Thank You (2006)
I Just Didn't Do It (2007)
Tokyo Tower: Mom and Me, and Sometimes Dad (2007)
Exte (2007)
Sad Vacation (2007)
Nightmare Detective 2 (2008), Takio Kagenuma
Tokyo! (2008)
2010s
Heaven's Story (2010), Shioya
Nude (2010), Enomoto
13 Assassins (2010)
Villain (2010)
Tokyo Oasis (2011)
Oba: The Last Samurai (2011)
Himizu (2011)
A Man with Style (2011)
Rent-a-Cat (2012)
Tokyo Playboy Club (2012)
Bread of Happiness (2012)
Outrage Beyond (2012)
Dawn of a Filmmaker (2013)
The Backwater (2013)
Homeland (2014)
Three Stories of Love (2015)
The Big Bee (2015)
A Cappella (2016)
A Man Called Pirate (2016)
Natsumi's Fipanly (2016)
Shin Godzilla (2016), the governor of Tokyo
14 That Night (2016), Takashi's father
Golden Orchestra (2016)
Outrage Coda (2017), Gomi
Side Job (2017)
Before We Vanish (2017), Suzuki
Pumpkin and Mayonnaise (2017), Yasuhara
Evil and the Mask (2018), Sakakibara
My Friend A (2018)
A Forest of Wool and Steel (2018), Akino
Mori, The Artist's Habitat (2018), Asahina
The Chaplain (2018)
The Fable (2019), Hamada
Strawberry Song (2019)
Mio on the Shore (2019)
Ninkyō Gakuen (2019)
Listen to the Universe (2019)
Black School Rules (2019), Toshio Inoue
I Was a Secret Bitch (2019)
And Life Goes On: The Movie (2019)
2020s
A Beloved Wife (2020)
Blue, Painful, Fragile (2020)
A Balance (2021)
The Supporting Actors: The Movie (2021), himself
Hama no Asahi to Usotsuki-domo to (2021)
My Daddy (2021), Chu-san
One Day, You Will Reach the Sea (2022)
BL Metamorphosis (2022), Numata
In Love and Deep Water (2023)
Ripples (2023)
Dreaming in Between (2023)

Television
Oshin (1983)
Ghost Soup (1992)
Gift (1997)
Bayside Shakedown (1998)
Yoshitsune (2005), Minamoto no Nakatsuna
Fūrin Kazan (2007), Yamamoto Sadahisa
Shingari (2015), Katase
Fukigen na Kajitsu (2016), Tetsushi Tsukui
Cold Case (2016), Tōru Kaneko
Midnight Diner: Tokyo Stories (2016)
The Supporting Actors (2017), himself
Frankenstein's Love (2017), Keijirō Inaba
Hiyokko (2017), Gorō Fukuda
Shimokitazawa Die Hard (2017), himself
Rikuoh (2017), Tōru Arimura
Naotora: The Lady Warlord (2017), Akechi Mitsuhide
Kiss that Kills (2018), Akira Dojima
The Supporting Actors 2 (2018), himself
When a Tree Falls (2018)
Designer Shibui Naoto no Kyūjitsu (2019), Naoto Shibui
And Life Goes On (2019)
Yell (2020), Yasutaka Sekiuchi
Our Sister's Soulmate (2020), Kikuo Kawakami
The Supporting Actors 3 (2021), himself
Pension Metsa (2021)
A Day-Off of Hana Sugisaki (2023)

Video games
Lost Judgment (2021), Akihiro Ehara

Awards

References

External links
 Official profile 

1961 births
Living people
Japanese male film actors
Japanese male television actors
People from Kitakyushu
20th-century Japanese male actors
21st-century Japanese male actors